Wikstroemia mononectaria is a shrub in the family Thymelaeaceae.  It is native to Taiwan.

Description
The shrub has black-purple, long, and slender branches.

References

mononectaria